Assassin is a 1969 South Korean thriller film.

Plot
A man is given a task to kill Hwang To-jin, a North Korean spy who turned himself in to South, and penetrates into the South. He meets Hwang To-jin's daughter and comes to feel skeptical of his behavior. Then he receives an order to hurry the assassination. He finally realizes that he has been foolish and turns himself to the police to help round up the spy network.

Cast
Jang Dong-he
Namkoong Won
Park Am
Kim Hea-kyung
Oh Ji-myung
Jeon Young-sun
Choe Bong
Lee Hae-ryong
Park Ki-teak
Kim Ki-bum

References

External links
 
 

1969 films
1960s spy thriller films
South Korean spy thriller films
Films directed by Lee Man-hee (director)
1960s Korean-language films